Mount Wurlali (also known as Mount Damar) is an andesitic stratovolcano on Damar Island in the Banda Arc system. Fumarolic activities with sulfur deposits are found at the twin summit craters and on the southeast flanks.

The Wurlali is the most active volcano in historical time of the Banda arc. He was at the northern end of a five- kilometer-wide caldera. On the southwest flank of the crater occurs from sulfur. The last eruption took place in 1892.

In 1993 there was an earthquake, landslides, and smoke. Four-thousand people were evacuated. On January 23, 2003, there was an earthquake with a magnitude of 6.1. Close to the beach, south-west of the volcano, hot springs emerged.

See also 

 List of volcanoes in Indonesia

References 

Volcanoes of the Lesser Sunda Islands
Stratovolcanoes of Indonesia
Active volcanoes of Indonesia
Holocene stratovolcanoes